Oke Ero is a Local Government Area in Kwara State, Nigeria. Its headquarters are in the town of Iloffa. Other Major towns  in Oke Ero are Odo-Owa, Idofin, Ekan Nla, Ayedun,Erin Mope, Egosi, Imode, Idofin Odo-Ase, Kajola and Ilale. The first executive chairman of Oke-Ero is the late Otunba Moses Afolayan, while the second was Barrister Kayode Towoju.

Traditional institutions

Established traditional titles and Seats in the Local Government Area are: Alofa of Iloffa — a first-class King, Olota of Odo-Owa, Elekan of Ekan Meje, Edemarun of Kajola, Onidofin of Idofin Igbana, Obajisun of Ayedun, Onimode of Imode, Odokogun of Ilale, Elegosi of Egosi, Onimoji of Imoji and Onidofin of Idofin Odo-Ase.

Oke-Ero Local Government Area was carved out of the present Ekiti Local Government Area of Kwara State.
Oke-Ero has an area of 438 km² and a population of 57,619 at the 2006 census, the population has since grown.

According to official documents reported by Bamidele Ola, an ethnographer who was posted and worked as a national youth corp member in Oke Ero between 2008 and 2009, Oke Ero is administratively divided into three districts: The Iloffa/Odo Owa District at the centre, The Idofin District at the north and the Ekan Meje District in the south of the local Government area.

The Iloffa/Odo-Owas District

This district comprises the Iloffa, Odo-Owa,Igbede,Kajola, Imode and Egosi Peoples. They occupy the central part of Oke-Ero and are bounded by the Osi-Ekiti Local Government area of Kwara State to the South and Omu-Aran in Irepodun Local Government to the North, they also share a boundary with Erimope Ekiti, Ekiti state, the district is about 80 to 90 km south of Ilorin, Kwara State. Tourist sites in the district include the Imole-Boja Rock Shelter; the Odo-Owa Adin Factory; The Relics of Apostle Joseph Ayodele Babalola (1904-1959), the world acclaimed “Father of Nigerian pentecostalism,” and His Prayer Mountain;” the Ancient Palace of the defunct Orota Kingdom, which comprises seven villages, namely: Owa,Imode, Ikotun,Egosi,Kajola,Igbede and Ilofa under Olota of Orota kingdom; the Are Hill/Ori Egunpe, amongst others. Common festivals include the Are Festival, the New Yam Festivals usually take place around June and early July of every year, the Egungun Festivals, the Agan Festival, the Eji Festival, amongst others.

The Idofin District

This district comprises the Idofin Igbana and Idofin Odo Ashe Peoples. The latter further comprises Idofin Odo Aga, Idofin Ayekale and the Idofin Ehin Afo Peoples; these three form what is presently known as the Idofin Odo Ashe. Tourist sites in the district include the Eromola Waterfall; Relics of the Eleegbo Ogbonko; Two giant mounts: the Ore Mount and the Ojokolo Mount, among others.
Common festivals here include the New Yam Festivals and the Egungun Festivals.

The Ekan Meje District

This district comprises the Ekan Nla, Ayedun, Erinmope, Ilale, Omoji and the Ajure Peoples. They occupy the southern part of Oke-Ero and are bounded by the Otun Ekiti in Moba Local Government area of Ekiti State and Ila in Osun State. The communities are closely knitted and are rich in cultural Heritage. The name Ekan Meje can literally be translated Seven Knots, formerly made up of seven communities, six mentioned already; the last of which are the Ipetu-Igbomina People who now prefer to be grouped with Ora People. Tourist sites in the district include the Palace of the Elekan of Ekan Nla, the Imoji Damp, the Bead Making Industry at Ayedun, amongst others. There are a huge number of festivals in this district such as the New Yam Festivals, the Egungun Festivals, the Oloku Festival, and the Ogun Festival, amongst others. The imperial ruler of these communities, being the Elekan of Ekan, Obajisun of Ayedun Kingdom.

<Bamidele Ola, 2009. Article Submitted to the Office of the Kings and Traditional Rulers of Oke Ero Local Government></ref>

Economy
The vegetation is tropical, hence the local economy is a hub for cash crops.
The main industry of the people is in the area of agriculture as her citizens are mainly farmers.
With her tropical climate, cocoa, sugar cane,yam,bananas, oranges, cotton and jute (a soft, shiny vegetable fiber that can be spun into coarse, strong threads), are common cash crops. The oil palm is a tropical palm tree, and the fruit from it is used to make palm oil. Palm oil can be bought in all the Communities of the Local Government Area.

The postal code of the area is 252.

References

Local Government Areas in Kwara State